The Long Way Home is a 2013 Turkish drama film directed by Alphan Eseli.

The film won the International Federation of Film Critics' Fipresci Award, the Golden Zenith Award for Best First Fiction Feature film from the 37th Montreal World Film Festival, and the New Talent Award for Best First Feature Film from the Hong Kong Asian Film Festival. Furthermore, The Long Way Home was nominated for the Sutherland Trophy at the 57th BFI London Film Festival.

Plot 
The Battle of Sarikamish, an engagement between the Russian and Ottoman Empire during World War I, resulted in the defeat of the Ottomans. Eastern Anatolia had become a place of uncertainty and chaos by January 1915, and neither the Russians nor the Ottomans held control. Due to absence of authority, the people were left to their own fate in a battle of survival.

Saci Efendi, who is an officer in the Ottoman Foreign Ministry, accompanies Gul Hanim, the wife of the Ministry's Principal Clerk, and her daughter, Nihan, on their way to Erzurum. They try to find their way in the terrible winter. On their first night in this remote and deserted village, they realize that they are not alone. Passing through a deserted village in the mountains of East Anatolia, 7 people from different walks of life try to endure the terrible winter conditions as well as starvation while attempting to make their way back to home.

Cast 
 Uğur Polat - Saci Bey
 Nergis Öztürk - Gül Hanim
 Serdar Orçin - Onbasi Sami
 Muharrem Bayrak - Çoban Ali
  - Er Mahmut
 Sıla Çetindağ - Zeynep

Music 
The score of the film was composed by Hungarian musician Mihály Víg - known for his collaborations with director Béla Tarr on films including The Turin House and Werckmeister Harmonies.

See also 
 2013 in film
 Turkish films of 2013
 Sarıkamış
 Battle of Sarikamish

References

External links 
 
 

 Variety [Ronnie Scheib]
 Birgün [Cüneyt Cebenoyan] (Turkish)
 Filmloverss [Utku Ögetürk] (Turkish)
 Filmuforia [Andre Simonoweicz]
 Fipresci [Serge Abiaad]
 Fipresci [Claudio Cordero]
 Milliyet Sanat [Selin Gurel] (Turkish)
 Phil on Film [Philip Concannon]
 Radikal [Senay Aydemir] (Turkish)
 Star [Serdar Akbiyik] (Turkish)
 Today's Zaman [Emine Yildirim]
 AnOther

2013 films
Turkish war drama films
2010s Turkish-language films
Films set in Turkey
2013 war drama films
2010s historical drama films
Turkish historical drama films
2013 drama films